Manchester City Football Club, then known as Ardwick, first entered the Football Alliance in the 1891–92 season. In 1892, the Football League decided to expand, and invited the Alliance clubs to join; having chosen not to apply for entry into the First Division, Ardwick were placed in the newly formed Second Division. In April 1894 Ardwick became Manchester City, following the creation of Manchester City Football Club Ltd. as a limited company.

The club's first team have competed in numerous nationally and internationally organised competitions, and all players who have played between 25 and 99 such matches, either as a member of the starting eleven or as a substitute, are listed below. Each player's details include the duration of his Manchester City career, his typical playing position while with the club, and the number of games played and goals scored in domestic league matches and in all senior competitive matches. Where applicable, the list also includes the national team for which the player was selected, and the number of senior international caps he won while playing for the club. The names are ordered first by number of appearances in total, then by date of debut.

Introduction
More than 290 players have represented Manchester City in at least 25 and fewer than 100 competitive first team matches. A number of the players listed achieved firsts or milestones for the club. David Weir, who captained the club in the Ardwick era, was the first England international to play for the club. Canadian Walter Bowman was the first international from outside the British Isles to play in the Football League. Denis Law, Steve Daley and Robinho were all signed for transfer fees that broke the British transfer fee record. Marc-Vivien Foé scored the last ever goal by a Manchester City player at the club's Maine Road ground in April 2003, just two months before his death, when he collapsed during an international match. The first competitive goal at the new City of Manchester Stadium was scored by Trevor Sinclair in August 2003.

Several listed players won medals while at the club. Herbert Burgess and George Livingstone both played in the 1904 FA Cup Final that brought Manchester City's first major trophy. Laurie Barnett won the Cup in 1934, Jack Dyson scored in the 1956 final, and Mario Balotelli, Patrick Vieira and Adam Johnson all took part in the club's 2011 FA Cup victory. Ken Mulhearn kept goal for the majority of the 1967–68 league championship winning season, and Ian Bowyer was part of the team that won the UEFA Cup Winners' Cup in 1970. Several members of the squads that won five Premier League titles between 2012 and 2021 are listed. Three of these players are still contracted to the club and may add to their current totals.

Key

Position
Playing positions are listed according to the tactical formations that were employed at the time. Thus the more defensive emphasis in the responsibilities of many of the old forward and midfield positions, and their corresponding name changes, reflects the tactical evolution that occurred in the sport from the late 1960s onwards. The position listed is that in which the player played most frequently for the club.

Club career
Club career is defined as the first and last calendar years in which the player appeared for the club in any of the competitions listed below, irrespective of how long the player was contracted to the club. For players who had two or more spells at the club, the years for each period are listed separately.

League appearances and League goals
League appearances and goals comprise those in the Football Alliance, the Football League and the Premier League. Appearances in the 1939–40 Football League season, abandoned after three games because of the Second World War, are excluded.

Total appearances and Total goals
Total appearances and goals comprise those in the Football Alliance, Football League (including test matches and play-offs), Premier League, FA Cup, Football League Cup, UEFA Champions League/European Cup, UEFA Europa League/UEFA Cup, FA Community Shield/Charity Shield, Associate Members' Cup, and defunct competitions the UEFA Cup Winners' Cup, Anglo-Italian Cup, Anglo-Italian League Cup, Texaco Cup, Anglo-Scottish Cup and Full Members' Cup. Matches in wartime competitions are excluded.

International selection
Countries are listed only for players who have been selected for international football. Only the highest level of international competition is given.
For players having played at full international level, the caps column counts the number of such appearances during his career with the club.

Last update
Statistics are correct as of 22 May 2022

Players with 25 to 99 appearances

See also
List of Manchester City F.C. players with fewer than 25 appearances
List of Manchester City F.C. players with more than 100 appearances''(Also includes winners of the Player of the Year award)

References
General

 Appearances and goals for players whose Manchester City career ended in the 2005–06 season or earlier: 
 Appearances and goals for players whose career continued beyond the 2005–06 season: 
 Playing positions and international recognition for players active before 1939: 
 International caps for players whose career ended in the 1983–84 season or earlier: 
Appearances and goals for players whose Manchester City career ended in the 1990s or earlier; international honours for players active in the 1990s:

Specific

 
Lists of association football players by club in England
Players
Association football player non-biographical articles